The 2002 AFC Futsal Championship was held in Jakarta, Indonesia from 22 October to 30 October 2002.

Venue

Draw

Group stage

Group A

Group B

Group C

Third placed teams

Knockout stage

Quarter-finals

Semi-finals

Third place play-off

Final

Awards 

 Most Valuable Player
 Anucha Munjarern
 Top Scorer
 Vahid Shamsaei (26 goals)
 Fair-Play Award

References

 Futsal Planet
 RSSSF

AFC Futsal Championship
F
Championship
International futsal competitions hosted by Indonesia
2000s in Jakarta
Sport in Jakarta